De que te quiero, te quiero (stylized as "De Q Te quiero, Te quiero" in its logo; English Title: Head Over Heels (previously known as Espuma de Venus and Solamente una vez) is a Mexican telenovela produced by Lucero Suárez for Televisa. It is a remake of Carita Pintada, in 1999, a Venezuelan telenovela written by Valentina Párraga. On Monday, July 1, 2013, Canal de las Estrellas started broadcasting De Que Te Quiero, Te Quiero weekdays at 6:15pm, replacing La Mujer Del Vendaval. The last episode was broadcast on Sunday, March 16, 2014, with El Color de la Pasión replacing on Monday, March 17, 2014.

Livia Brito stars as the protagonist; Juan Diego Covarrubias stars as the dual protagonist/antagonist; Fabiola Guajardo, first actor Aarón Hernán, and Esmeralda Pimentel star as the antagonists; Cynthia Klitbo, Marcelo Córdoba, Marisol del Olmo, Gerardo Murguía and Carlos Ferro are the stellar performances.

Production of De Que Te Quiero, Te Quiero officially started on April 22, 2013. In the United States, Univision broadcast De que te quiero, te quiero from March 10, 2014 to August 29, 2014.

Plot
Natalia (Livia Brito) and Diego (Juan Diego Covarrubias) meet in Túxpan, Veracruz, and love between the two arises from the first moment they see each other. Diego is a handsome young businessman, noble and with good feelings, who lives in Mexico City, is the vice president of Caprico Industries and grandson of the powerful Don Vicente Cáceres (Aarón Hernán), a bitter, arrogant, and controlling man. Natalia is a beautiful, simple young girl from a humble family, she is a fast food errand girl and is chosen as the queen of the fishermen's village. But she does not know that Diego has a twin brother: Rodrigo (also Covarrubias), a seductive young man with bad feelings and all that glitters is not gold without scruples. On the night of the coronation, Rodrigo tries to rape Natalia pretending to be Diego, but Andrés (José Carlos Femat) appears (who has always been in love with Natalia), defends her and Rodrigo falls hitting his head and is left in a coma.

When the young woman tells her mother, Carmen (Cynthia Klitbo), what happened, she fears that Rodrigo is going to denounce her, so the García family moves to Mexico City with the excuse of "trying their luck at work" and opens a small restaurant. In addition, some of Natalia's acquaintances live in Mexico: a priest Juancho (Rolando Brito), her godmother Luz (Silvia Mariscal), and Eleazar (Marcelo Córdoba), the son of Luz and Carmen's childhood friend who is also the latter's love interest.

Irene (Marisol del Olmo), Vicente's daughter and Diego and Rodrigo's aunt, returns to Mexico City. Irene is a depressive woman marked by destiny: when she was very young, she became pregnant by Tadeo; when her father found out, he took his daughter away from her, made her believe that she died and sent her to live abroad. Irene takes refuge in alcohol and gives her father a hard time to show him her hatred.

Soon after, Natalia meets Diego again. At first, she runs away from him while remaining under the impression that Diego had tried to rape her (while in reality it was Rodrigo who tried to do that) as he pursues her looking for an explanation of her rejection, since Diego never knew that she and his twin brother had an unpleasant encounter. When they manage to clear things up, the two cannot restart their love, because Diego is now married to Diana Mendoza (Esmeralda Pimentel). Their relationship will not only be hindered by Diana's obsessive whims, but also by Don Vicente, who disapproves of their love. 

Consumed by extreme jealousy and obsession for Diego, Diana soon dies trying to run over Natalia in a car crash, thus ending her threat to separate Natalia and Diego, but the nightmares of the latter two don't end there. Another threat has begun as Rodrigo eventually gets out of his coma (in reality he was faking it unbeknownst to everyone as he regained consciousness a while back) to proceed with his revenge on Natalia by separating her from his brother Diego to keep her for himself. Rodrigo also found Brigitte (Fabiola Guajardo), Natalia's younger sister, as a newfound ally and lover to help him get revenge while Brigitte does the same as she always hated Natalia out of pure jealousy and pettiness. Because of these unpleasant circumstances, Natalia and Diego will have to fight to be together and love each other even more while investigating further secretive moments from the past.

Cast
Confirmed as of March 21, 2013.
 Livia Brito as Natalia García Pabuena / Natalia Vargas Cáceres de Cáceres
 Juan Diego Covarrubias as Diego / Rodrigo Cáceres
 Cynthia Klitbo as Carmen García Pabuena de Medina
 Marcelo Córdoba as Eleazar Medina Suárez
 Aarón Hernán as Vicente Cáceres
 Marisol del Olmo as Irene Cáceres de Vargas 
 Silvia Mariscal as Luz Suárez de Medina 
 Alfredo Gatica as Abdul García Pabuena 
 Fabiola Guajardo as Brigitte García Pabuena
 Pierre Louis as Paolo García Pabuena
 Fernanda Sasse as Guadalupe "Lupita" García Pabuena 
 Gerardo Murguía as Tadeo Vargas
 Carmen Becerra as Mireya "La Jaiba" Zamudio
 Daniela Luján as Karina Montiel
 Carlos Ferro as Alonso Cortés 
 Eduardo Shaklett as Abdul Abdalá
 Esmeralda Pimentel as Diana Mendoza Grajales de Cáceres
 Arleth Terán as Cunchetina Capone de Ricci
 Lisardo as Roberto Esparza / Carlos Pereyra
 Laura Carmine as Simona Verduzco
 Ricardo Fernández Rue as Alberto Campos
 Hugo Macías Macotela as Tiburcio Chavez
 Mirta Renee as Kimberly 
 Sofia Tejeda as Lala
 Polo Monarrez as Edwin Morales
 Rolando Brito as Padre Juan "Juancho" Rivera
 José Carlos Femat as Andrés Figueroa
 Ricardo Kleinbaum as Gino Ricci
 Alejandro Ibarra as Paul Champignon
 José Luis Badalt as Óscar

Reception 
On Univision, the finale of De Que Te Quiero, Te Quiero reached 3.1 million viewers with a 12.7 rating.

Awards and nominations

References

2013 telenovelas
2013 Mexican television series debuts
2014 Mexican television series endings
Television shows set in Mexico City
Television shows set in Acapulco
Mexican telenovelas
Televisa telenovelas
Mexican television series based on Venezuelan television series
Spanish-language telenovelas